Grand River Township is a township in Decatur County, Iowa, USA.  As of the 2000 census, its population was 112. The African American entrepreneur and publisher of the Iowa Bystander John Lay Thompson was born on his family's farm in the township in 1869.

Geography
Grand River Township covers an area of 35.76 square miles (92.61 square kilometers); of this, 0.07 square miles (0.18 square kilometers) or 0.19 percent is water. The streams of South Elk Creek and West Elk Creek run through this township.

Adjacent townships
 Richland Township (north)
 Long Creek Township (northeast)
 Decatur Township (east)
 Burrell Township (southeast)
 Bloomington Township (south)
 Athens Township, Ringgold County (southwest)
 Monroe Township, Ringgold County (west)
 Union Township, Ringgold County (northwest)

Cemeteries
The township contains three cemeteries: Millsap, Oak Hill and Old Funk.

References
 U.S. Board on Geographic Names (GNIS)
 United States Census Bureau cartographic boundary files

External links
 US-Counties.com
 City-Data.com

Townships in Decatur County, Iowa
Townships in Iowa